The 2000 Cable & Wireless ODI Series was a One Day International (ODI) cricket where West Indies played host to Pakistan and Zimbabwe. Pakistan and West Indies reached the Finals, which Pakistan won 2–1.

Squads

Point table

Group matches

1st match

2nd match

3rd match

4th match

5th match

6th match

Final series
Pakistan won the best of three final series against West Indies 2–1.

1st final

2nd final

3rd final

External links 
 Series home at Cricinfo

References

2000 in West Indian cricket
2000 in Pakistani cricket
2000 in Zimbabwean cricket
1999–2000
1999-2000